Letca Nouă is a commune located in Giurgiu County, Muntenia, Romania. It is composed of three villages: Letca Nouă, Letca Veche and Milcovățu.

References

External links 

Communes in Giurgiu County
Localities in Muntenia